St Mary's Church is an active Anglican church  in Great Wymondley, Hertfordshire, England.
It is a Grade I listed building.

History
In 1199, Reginald de Argentein, lord of the manor of Great Wymondley, brought a case against the Abbess of Elstow over the advowson of the chapel, as it then was. The Abbess claimed that the chapel was part of the possessions of the church at Hitchin, and had been granted to the Abbey by Judith of Lens, niece of William I. Richard lost the case. Although vicars were appointed to Great Wymondley from 1361, the church remained under Elstow Abbey until the Dissolution.

The benefice is currently St Ippolyts with Great and Little Wymondley.

Architecture
It has a Norman nave and chancel, the latter being an apse built of small rounded stones. Only two other medieval churches in Hertfordshire retain an apse (St Leonard's Church, Bengeo and St John the Baptist's Church, Great Amwell), but originally the church at Little Wymondley had an apsidal east end too.

References

External links

Church of England church buildings in Hertfordshire
Grade I listed churches in Hertfordshire
English churches with Norman architecture